Bad Moon Rising was a rock band that rose to superstar status in Japan with a series of hard rock albums led by Scottish born vocalist Kal Swan (real name Norman Swan) and guitarist Doug Aldrich. 

Both Kal Swan and Doug are ex-Lion members, whilst the rhythm team of bassist Ian Mayo and drummer Jackie Ramos had played in both Hericane Alice and Bangalore Choir. Prior to relocating from England to Los Angeles Swan had fronted up the NWOBHM heavy metal band Tytan.

History
The debut album, produced by Mack sees musicians including UFO axeman Michael Schenker and Robin Mcauley together with ex-Quiet Riot bassist Chuck Wright, Michael Schenker Group’s Rocky Newton and Fifth Angel and Alice Cooper drummer Ken Mary. Both Wright and Mary are of course former House of Lords cohorts.  Bad Moon Rising put in an extensive tour of Japan during June 1991 and were voted by readers of the influential Burrn! magazine as ‘Brightest new hope’ for the following year.

1993’s Blood album features the guest rhythm section showing of Wright and Mary once more, however Ramos and Mayo appear in the booklet and are listed as full members. The album was delivered in Japan during March with an EP Blood On The Streets issued the following month. Bad Moon Rising returned to Japan in October for a further run of dates, giving a nod to their influences by including Bad Company’s ‘Movin’ On’, Thin Lizzy’s ‘Cowboy Song’ and Deep Purple’s ‘Highway Star’ in their live set.

Doug Aldrich struck out on his own in 1994. Releasing the mainly instrumental Highcentered album. Such was the band’s stature in Japan the guitarist put in a series of appearances to plug this solo effort.

The French release of Opium For The Masses came complete with a free four-track EP containing previously unreleased material. Touring had the band gigging throughout France in May, including a support to Van Halen at Le Zenith in Paris, upfront of Japanese gigs. The set this time around featured two Jimi Hendrix workouts ‘Purple Haze’ and ‘Voodoo Chile’ plus another Thin Lizzy tune ‘Don’t Believe A Word’.  The following year both Opium For The Masses and Highcentered saw release in the USA. Such was fan fervour for Bad Moon Rising in Japan that North American versions of Opium For The Masses were imported back so that ardent fans could buy both variants.

A second solo album from Aldrich, Electrovision, emerged in Japan during 1997, featuring Kal Swan on the song Sky Blue and Black. In November 1998 the band had officially broken up and in 1999 Aldrich had created a new act Burning Rain fronted by ex-Medicine Wheel vocalist Keith St John.

2005 saw the re-packaging of all three Bad Moon Rising albums, plus eight bonus tracks, by the Italian label Frontiers Records under the billing 'The Full Moon Collection'.

Discography
Full Moon Fever (EP) (1991)
Bad Moon Rising (1991)
Blood (1993)
Blood On The Streets (EP) (1993)
Opium For The Masses (1995)
Junkyard Haze (EP) (1995)
Flames On The Moon (1999)
Full Moon Collection (2005)

External links
 Doug Aldrich Official Website
 Bad Moon Rising Blog
 Bad Moon Rising website

American hard rock musical groups
Frontiers Records artists